Angel's writhing skink (Lygosoma angeli) is a species of lizard in the family Scincidae. The species is native to Southeast Asia.

Etymology
The specific name, angeli, is in honor of French herpetologist Fernand Angel.

Geographic range
L. angeli is found in Cambodia, Laos, Thailand, and Vietnam.

Habitat

Description
Dorsally, L. angeli is brown, reddish brown, or dark brown. Ventrally, it is tan. The tail length equals SVL.

Behavior
L. angeli is terrestrial and fossorial. It hides under bark of trees and stumps. It also burrows in loose soil and under fallen logs.

Reproduction
The mode of reproduction of L. angeli is unknown.

References

Further reading
Cota M, Geissler P, Chan-ard T, Makchai S (2011). "First Record of Lygosoma angeli (Smith, 1937) (Reptilia: Squamata: Scincidae) in Thailand with Notes on Other Specimens from Laos". The Thailand Natural History Museum Journal 5 (2): 125–132.
Geissler P, Nguyen TQ, Phung TM, Van Devender RW, Hartmann T, Farkas B, Ziegler T, Böhme W (2011). "A review of Indochinese skinks of the genus Lygosoma Hardwicke & Gray, 1827 (Squamata: Scincidae), with natural history notes and an identification key". Biologia 66 (6): 1159–1176.
Greer AE (1977). "The systematics and evolutionary relationships of the scincid lizard genus Lygosoma ". Journal of Natural History 11: 515–540. (Lygosoma angeli, new combination).
Neang T, Morawska D, Nut M (2015). "First record of Lygosoma angeli (Smith, 1937) (Squamata: Scincidae) from eastern Cambodia". Herpetology Notes 8: 321–322.
Smith MA (1937). "Un nouveau Lézard de Conchinchine ". Bulletin du Muséum d'Histoire Naturelle, 2° Série 9 (6): 366. (Riopa angeli, new species). (in French).

Lygosoma
Reptiles described in 1937
Taxa named by Malcolm Arthur Smith
Reptiles of Southeast Asia